Paneli Moti is a village in Upleta, a tehsil in the Rajkot district of Gujarat, India.

Notable people 
 Jinnah family and, among them, Emibai_Jinnah (1878-1893), first wife of Muhammad Ali Jinnah, founder of Pakistan
Harshad Mehta, an Indian stockbroker

References

Villages in Rajkot district